Cartularium Saxonicum is a three volume collection of Anglo-Saxon charters published from 1885 to 1893 by Walter de Gray Birch (1842-1924), then working in the Department of Manuscripts at the British Library.

The most recent edition was released on May 24, 2012 by Cambridge University Press.

References

1885 books
1890s books
Anglo-Saxon reference works
Reference works in the public domain